Adina Diaconu (born 14 October 1999) is a Romanian table tennis player.

In 2015 and 2016, she was part of the Romanian junior team which won gold medals at the European Youth Table Tennis Championships. She won European youth titles in three different age categories, including the cadget champion in 2013 and 2014, the junior champion in 2015 and 2016, and the U21 champion in 2019.

References

1999 births
Living people
Romanian female table tennis players
Table tennis players at the 2014 Summer Youth Olympics